General Lucian King Truscott Jr. (January 9, 1895 – September 12, 1965) was a highly decorated senior United States Army officer, who saw distinguished active service during World War II. Between 1943–1945, he successively commanded the 3rd Infantry Division, VI Corps, Fifteenth Army and Fifth Army, serving mainly in the Mediterranean Theater of Operations (MTO) during his wartime service. He and Alexander Patch were the only U.S. Army officers to command a division, a corps, and a field army in combat during the war.

Early life and family
Truscott was born in Chatfield, Texas on January 6, 1895, a son of Dr. Lucian King Truscott (1861–1922) and Maria Temple (Tully) Truscott (1866–1938). Raised primarily in Oklahoma, he attended grade school and a year of high school in the hamlet of Stella, near Norman. At age 16, he claimed to be 18 and a high school graduate to qualify for teacher training, attended the summer term of the state normal school in Norman, and received his teaching certification. He taught school and worked as a school principal before he decided to join the United States Army in 1917. Enlisting during the American entry into World War I, Truscott applied for officer training, falsely claiming to be a high school graduate who had completed the equivalent of a year of college. After completing the officer training camp at Fort Logan H. Roots, in October 1917 he was commissioned a second lieutenant in the Cavalry Branch of the U.S. Army. During the war, he remained in the United States to patrol the border with Mexico, and served with the 17th Cavalry Regiment at Camp Harry J. Jones, Douglas, Arizona.

On March 27, 1919, Truscott married Sarah "Chick" Nicholas Randolph (1896–1974), a descendant of Thomas Jefferson Randolph and Thomas Nelson Jr. They were the parents of three children – Mary Randolph Truscott (1920–1991), Lucian King (1921–2000), and James Joseph (b. 1930–2020).

Military career

Truscott served in various cavalry and staff assignments between the wars, including completion of the Cavalry Officers Course, followed by assignment as a Cavalry School instructor. He also graduated from the United States Army Command and General Staff College, followed by assignment to its faculty. In the early 1930s, he commanded E Troop, 3rd Cavalry Regiment, which was stationed at Fort Myer, Virginia. On August 18, 1940 he was promoted to lieutenant colonel.

World War II
In July 1941, Truscott was appointed to the staff of Ninth Corps Area, at Fort Lewis, Washington.  In 1942, Truscott, now a temporary colonel (having been promoted on December 24, 1941), was instrumental in developing an American commando unit patterned after the British Commandos. The American unit was activated by Truscott (newly promoted to the rank of brigadier general on June 19, 1942) as the 1st Ranger Battalion, and placed under the command of Major William Orlando Darby.

In May 1942, Truscott was assigned to the Allied Combined Staff under Lord Louis Mountbatten and in August, he was the primary U.S. observer on the Dieppe Raid. The raid was primarily a Canadian operation, consisting of elements of the 2nd Canadian Infantry Division, with two British Commandos attached along with a 50-man detachment from the 1st Ranger Battalion. The Rangers were assigned to No. 3 Commando, No. 4 Commando, and 6 Rangers were spread out among the Canadian regiments. This was considered the first action by American troops against German forces in World War II.

On November 8, 1942, now a major general, Truscott led the 9,000 men of the 60th Infantry Regiment (part of the 9th Infantry Division) and 66th Armored Regiment (part of the 2nd Armored Division) in the landings at Mehdia and Port Lyautey in Morocco, part of Operation Torch under Major General George S. Patton.

Division commander
Truscott took command of the 3rd Infantry Division in March 1943, and oversaw preparations for the Allied invasion of Sicily, codenamed Operation Husky. He was known as a very tough trainer, bringing the 3rd Infantry Division up to a very high standard. At the age of 48, he was one of the youngest division commanders in the U.S. Army at the time.

He led the division in the assault on Sicily in July 1943, coming under the command of the Seventh U.S. Army, commanded by Patton, now a lieutenant general. Here his training paid off when the division covered great distances in the mountainous terrain at high speed. The famous 'Truscott Trot' was a marching pace of five miles per hour over the first mile, thereafter four miles per hour, much faster than the usual standard of 2.5 miles per hour. The 3rd Infantry Division was considered to be the best-trained, best-led division in the Seventh Army and Truscott himself was highly rated by Patton, who wrote in an officer efficiency report, stating that, "I know of no other major general who has more efficiently performed as a Division Commander." He rated Truscott 5th out of 155 general officers.

After a brief rest to absorb replacements the division, in mid-September, nine days after the initial Allied landings at Salerno, Italy, came ashore on the Italian mainland, where it fought its way up the Italian peninsula, under the command of the VI Corps, commanded by Major General John P. Lucas. The VI Corps was part of Lieutenant General Mark W. Clark's United States Fifth Army. After crossing the Volturno Line in October and fighting in severe winter weather around the Gustav Line, which saw heavy casualties sustained, the division was pulled out of the line for rest and relaxation.

In January 1944, the division assaulted Anzio as part of the U.S. VI Corps, which also included the British 1st Infantry Division, along with two British Commandos and three battalions of U.S. Army Rangers, Combat Command B of the 1st Armored Division and the 504th Parachute Regimental Combat Team. The operation, the brainchild of British Prime Minister Winston Churchill, was intended to outflank, and potentially force the Germans to withdraw from their Winter Line defenses, which had considerably slowed Allied progress in Italy.

Corps commander
Lucas, the corps commander, initially decided not to push inland, as Allied commanders had intended, and Truscott's 3rd Division was soon engaged in bitter fighting and, again, suffering heavy losses as the Germans launched numerous counterattacks to drive the Allies into the sea. With Clark, the Fifth Army commander, and General Sir Harold R. L. G. Alexander, Commander-in-Chief (C-in-C) of the Allied Armies in Italy (AAI), growing increasingly worried about the situation, Truscott was appointed as Lucas's deputy commander and, after Lucas was dismissed on 17 February, Truscott assumed command. Truscott was succeeded in command of the 3rd Infantry Division by Major General John "Iron Mike" O'Daniel, previously the Assistant Division Commander (ADC). At the age of 49, Truscott was the second youngest corps commander in the U.S. Army, behind only J. Lawton Collins, then commanding VII Corps in England. Clark, writing in his memoirs after the war, claimed that he "selected Truscott to become the new VI Corps commander because of all the division commanders available to me in the Anzio bridgehead who were familiar with the situation he was the most outstanding. A quiet, competent, and courageous officer with great battle experience through North Africa, Sicily, and Italy, he inspired confidence in all with whom he came in contact."

Following Anzio, Truscott continued to command VI Corps through the fighting up the Italian boot, helping in the final Battle of Monte Cassino and the subsequent capture of Rome, just two days before the Normandy landings. However, his command was then withdrawn from the line to prepare for Operation Dragoon, the amphibious assault on southern France.

On 15 August 1944, VI Corps landed in southern France and initially faced relatively little opposition. The rapid retreat of the German Nineteenth Army resulted in swift gains for the Allied forces. The invasion plan was initially for US forces to conduct the initial landing, and Free French forces to conduct the breakout. This was changed to exploit the withdrawal of the German 19th Army, and US VI Corps began a pursuit. This resulted in cutting off the escape of the enemy, and their total destruction or capture. The Dragoon force met up with southern thrusts from Operation Overlord in mid-September, near Dijon.

A planned benefit of Dragoon was the usefulness of the port of Marseille. The rapid Allied advance after Operation Cobra and Dragoon slowed almost to a halt in September 1944 due to a critical lack of supplies, as thousands of tons of supplies were shunted to northwest France to compensate for the inadequacies of port facilities and land transport in northern Europe. Marseille and the southern French railways were brought back into service despite heavy damage to the port of Marseille and its railroad trunk lines. They became a significant supply route for the Allied advance into Germany, providing about a third of the Allied needs.

Army commander
On 2 September 1944, Truscott was promoted to the three-star rank of lieutenant general and in October he was appointed commander of the newly formed Fifteenth Army, which was largely an administrative and training command.

Truscott's next command came in December 1944. He was promoted to command of the U.S. Fifth Army in Italy when its commander Lieutenant General Mark Clark was made commander of the Allied 15th Army Group, formerly the Allied Armies in Italy (AAI). Truscott led the Fifth Army through the hard winter of 1944–1945, where many of its formations were in exposed positions in the mountains of Italy. He then led the army through the Allied Spring 1945 offensive in Italy culminating in the final destruction of the German forces in Italy.

Post-war era
Truscott took over command of the Third Army from General George S. Patton on 8 October 1945, and led it until April 1946. This command included the Eastern Military District of the U.S. occupation zone of Germany, which consisted primarily of the state of Bavaria. When the Seventh Army was deactivated in March 1946, Truscott's Third Army took over the Western Military District (the U.S.-occupied parts of Baden, Württemberg and Hesse-Darmstadt). Truscott was reassigned in April 1946 and retired from the army on September 30, 1947.

Will Lang Jr. from Life wrote a biography on Truscott that appeared in the October 2, 1944, issue of that magazine.

After leaving the United States Army, Truscott began work on his book Command Missions, which was published in 1954, and The Twilight of the U.S. Cavalry. The latter book was published after his death by his son, Lucian III, in 1989. In 1954, Congress passed Public Law 83-508, which promoted several World War II senior officers who had exercised responsibilities greater than their rank; as a numbered army commander, Truscott carried out the duties of a four-star general, and the 1954 law promoted him to general on the retired list.

Truscott helped evaluate officers as a member of the War Department Screening Board. Then in 1948–1949, he spent a year as the Chairman of the Army Advisory Board for Amphibious Operations, at Fort Monroe, Virginia. It was between meetings of this board that he began assembling the material for his two books.

Central Intelligence Agency
In 1951, Walter Bedell Smith, Director of the Central Intelligence Agency (CIA), appointed Truscott as "Special Consultant to the United States Commissioner" in Frankfurt, Germany. However, this was simply a cover for his real assignment as senior CIA representative in Germany. Truscott had been placed in charge of cloak-and-dagger operations in a vital part of Europe. This only came to light after declassification of a secret memorandum in 1994.

In 1953, President Eisenhower approved CIA Director Allen Dulles' recommendation that General Truscott be appointed the CIA's Deputy Director for Coordination. This appointment meant that Truscott was now controlling the agency's rapidly expanding network of agents worldwide. His responsibilities included facilitating the overthrow of governments in Iran and Guatemala. Truscott was involved in planning Operation PBSuccess, the CIA mission to overthrow Guatemalan President Jacobo Árbenz. According to Harry Jeffers' biography, Truscott was instrumental in convincing Eisenhower to support PBSuccess with air power. However, another biography by William Heefner suggests that specifics of Truscott's involvement cannot be substantiated.

Truscott left the CIA in 1958. He wrote nothing about his service in the CIA in Command Missions, and there is nothing about his CIA activities in his papers at the George C. Marshall Library.

Death and legacy
Truscott died on 12 September 1965, in Alexandria, Virginia and was buried at Arlington National Cemetery, in Arlington, Virginia. On 29 April 1966, Truscott Hall, a bachelor officers' quarters at the United States Army War College, was named after him. On 17 August 1974, Sarah Truscott, his wife, died and was buried next to him at Arlington National Cemetery.

In 2012, Truscott was honored at his birthplace of Chatfield.

Personality
Truscott had a very gravelly voice, said to be the result of an accidental ingestion of acid in childhood. He was superstitious about his clothing, and usually wore a leather jacket, "pink" pants and lucky boots in combat. He also wore a white scarf as a trademark, first during the Sicilian campaign.

Truscott once said to his son, "Let me tell you something, and don't ever forget it. You play games to win, not lose. And you fight wars to win. That's spelled W-I-N!  And every good player in a game and every good commander in a war…has to have some son of a bitch in him. If he doesn't, he isn't a good player or commander....It's as simple as that. No son of a bitch, no commander."

Truscott was respected by his subordinates. A medical officer in the Seventh Army related stories he'd heard from the men who served under Truscott earlier. Unlike some commanders, Truscott was not noted for self-aggrandisement, nor did he suffer such from his superiors. Others noted he was humbled by the sacrifices those under him had made. Bill Mauldin described the time Truscott gave the address on Memorial Day, May 31, 1945, in the military cemetery at Nettuno, outside Anzio: "He turned his back on the assembled windbags and sparklers and talked to the crosses in the cemetery, quietly, apologizing, and then walked away without looking around."

In popular culture
Truscott was portrayed by actor John Doucette in the 1970 film Patton. In one scene, as commander of the 3rd Infantry Division during the Allied invasion of Sicily, Truscott is shown arguing vehemently with General Patton over the latter's orders pertaining to his division.

Truscott was portrayed by Willis Bouchey in The Young Invaders and Charles H. Gray in Ike: The War Years.

Decorations and medals
Truscott received the United States Army's second-highest decoration, the Distinguished Service Cross, for valor in action in Sicily on July 11, 1943, the second day of the invasion. Truscott's other decorations include the Army Distinguished Service Medal with two Oak Leaf Clusters, the Navy Distinguished Service Medal, the Legion of Merit and the Purple Heart.

Dates of rank
Source – U.S. Army Register, 1948; pg. 2471.

Notes
Footnotes

References

Bibliography

External links

Short biography of General Lucian Truscott Jr. at Third Army website

Truscott, Lucian K., IV, "The Unsentimental Warrior", The New York Times, June 23, 2010
Generals of World War II
United States Army Officers 1939–1945

|-

|-

|-

|-

1895 births
1965 deaths
United States Army Cavalry Branch personnel
United States Army Command and General Staff College alumni
United States Army Command and General Staff College faculty
People from Navarro County, Texas
Military personnel from Texas
United States Army personnel of World War I
United States Army generals of World War II
Recipients of the Distinguished Service Cross (United States)
Recipients of the Distinguished Service Medal (US Army)
Recipients of the Navy Distinguished Service Medal
Recipients of the Legion of Merit
American people of English descent
American people of Irish descent
Burials at Arlington National Cemetery
United States Army generals